The 1996–97 Scottish Challenge Cup was the seventh season of the competition, competed for by the 30 member clubs of the Scottish Football League. The defending champions were Stenhousemuir, who defeated Dundee United 5–4 on penalties after a 0–0 draw after extra time in the 1995 final.

The final was played on 3 November 1996, between Stranraer and St Johnstone at Broadwood Stadium in Cumbernauld. Stranraer won 1–0 courtesy of an own goal, to win the tournament for the first time.

Schedule

First round 
Airdrieonians and East Fife received random byes into the second round.

Source: SFL

Second round 

Source: SFL

Quarter-finals

Semi-finals

Final

References

External links 
 Scottish Football League Scottish Challenge Cup on Scottish Football League website
 Soccerbase Scottish League Challenge Cup on Soccerbase.com
 ESPN Soccernet  Scottish League Challenge Cup homepage on ESPN Soccernet
 BBC Sport – Scottish Cups Challenge Cup on BBC Sport

Scottish Challenge Cup seasons
Challenge Cup
Scottish Challenge Cup